Lavrans Solli (born 21 February 1992) is a Norwegian backstroke swimmer. He was born in Oslo. He competed at the 2012 Summer Olympics in London.

References

Norwegian male backstroke swimmers
1992 births
Living people
Sportspeople from Oslo
Swimmers at the 2012 Summer Olympics
Olympic swimmers of Norway
Swimmers at the 2010 Summer Youth Olympics
21st-century Norwegian people